Albert Clinton Vaughn Sr. (October 9, 1894 – September 1, 1951) was an American politician who served as a member of the U.S. House of Representatives from Pennsylvania.

Early life and education 
Vaughn was born in West Catasauqua, Pennsylvania. He graduated from Allentown Business College in Allentown, Pennsylvania in 1911, and also completed an extension course in business administration.

Career 
During World War II, he served as a yeoman in the United States Navy. For twenty-five years, he was engaged in private industry, including engineering, administrative, and sales positions. He was elected a school director in Whitehall Township, Pennsylvania, in 1929 for a six-year term. He served as an executive assistant to Representative Charles L. Gerlach in 1945 and to Representative Franklin H. Lichtenwalter in 1947.

Vaughn was elected as a Republican to the 82nd Congress and served from January 3, 1951, until his death in Fullerton, Pennsylvania. He was interred at the Fairview Cemetery in West Catasauqua, Pennsylvania.

See also
 List of United States Congress members who died in office (1950–99)

References

External links

1894 births
1951 deaths
People from Lehigh County, Pennsylvania
United States Navy personnel of World War I
Republican Party members of the United States House of Representatives from Pennsylvania
20th-century American politicians